{{Infobox climber
| name            = Laura Rogora
| image           = Laura Rogora WCh 2018.jpg
| image_size      = 
| alt             =
| caption         = 
| nickname        =
| nationality     = Italian
| birth_date      = 
| birth_place     = Rome, Italy
| death_date      = 
| death_place     = 
| residence       =
| education       =
| occupation      = Professional rock climber
| height          = 152 cm
| weight          = 
| website         = 
| typeofclimber   = Sport climbing
| highestgrade    = 
| highestredpoint =
| highestonsight  =
| highestboulder  =
| knownfor        = First Italian female and the second youngest (age 14) climber to climb a 9a, the fifth woman and first Italian woman to climb 9a+
| firstascents    = {{ubl|'Rèveille-toi 9a, Cueva di Collepardo| Sitting Bull, 8c+/9a, Cueva di Collepardo | Ercole, 8c/+ Cueva di Collepardo | La Gasparata, 8c+/9a, Cueva di Collepardo | Supercrack, 8b+/8c, Cueva di Collepardo |Tomorrowland extension, 8c+/9a, Cueva di Collepardo}}
| namedroutes     = 
| majorascents    =
| retired         =
| worlds          =
| medaltemplates  =

|show-medals = yes
| updated         = 
}}
Laura Rogora (born 28 April 2001) is an Italian sport climber. She competed at the 2020 Summer Olympics, in Women's combined sport climbing.  In 2015, she became the second youngest climber, at age 14, to complete a  route. In 2019, Rogora qualified to compete at the 2020 Summer Olympic Games, finished 2nd in lead at the IFSC Climbing European Championships
 and won 3 of 4 possible gold medals at the IFSC Climbing World Youth Championships, coming first in lead, boulder and combined categories in the Junior age group.

Notable ascents

On-sight
 
 Ixeia, Rodellar, Spain, July 2020
 L-mens, Montsant, Spain, January 2020

Redpoint

 9b (5.15b)Erebor, Italy, October 2021 (bolted and first ascended by Stefano Ghisolfi); only third-ever woman in history to climb a 9b route.
 

 Ali Hulk Sit Extension Total, Rodellar, Spain, July 2020 (was once considered potential 9b)Pure Dreaming Plus, Arco, Italy, 30 May 2020 (First female ascent and first repeat of the route, established by Adam Ondra)
 The Bow, Arco, Italy, November 2020Grandi Gesti, Sperlonga, Italy, March 2016Joe-cita, Oliana, Spain, February 2017Esclatamasters, Spain, January 2019La Bongada, Margalef, Spain, January 2020The Bomb, Rodellar, Spain, July 2020
8c+/9a (5.14c/5.14d)Pal Norte, Margalef, Spain, December 2019Underground, Massone, Italy, June 2020Joe Blau, Oliana, Spain, January 2017Hulk Extension Total, Rodellar, Spain, July 2020Ciccio Formaggio, Grotta dell’Aerenauta, Sperlonga, Italy, December 2014 (her first 8c at age 13).Il Corvo, Ferentillo, Italy, April 2015Wallstreet, Frankenjura, Germany, August 2016

First ascentsTomorrowland extension, 8c+/9a (5.14c/5.14d), Cueva di Collepardo, November 2016Supercrack, 8c+/9a (5.14c/5.14d), Cueva di Collepardo, December 2016La Gasparata, 8c+/9a (5.14c/5.14d), Cueva di Collepardo, January 2017 Ercole, Cueva di Collepardo, March 2017It segid narg, Grotta dell'Arenauta Sperlonga, December 2017 Sitting Bull, 8c+/9a (5.14c/5.14d), Cueva di Collepardo, April 2018Rèveille-toi'', Cueva di Collepardo, June 2019

Competition highlights

IFSC Olympic qualifying
IFSC Combined Qualifier Toulouse 2019
Women combined: 8th (qualified)

IFSC Climbing European Championships
2020 IFSC Climbing World Cup (Briançon)
Women lead: 1st
2019 IFSC Climbing European Championships (Edinburgh)
Women lead: 2nd

IFSC Climbing World Youth Championships
 2019 IFSC Youth World Championships (Arco)
 Female Youth Juniors combined: 1st
 Female Youth Juniors boulder: 1st
 Female Youth Juniors lead: 1st
2018 IFSC Youth World Championships (Moscow)
Female Youth A boulder: 1st
Female Youth A lead: 6th
2017 IFSC Youth World Championships (Innsbruck)
Female Youth A combined: 6th
Female Youth A boulder: 4th
Female Youth A combined: 5th

European Youth Championships
2017 European Youth Championships (Lead & Speed) (Perm)
Female Youth A lead: 4th

See also 
List of grade milestones in rock climbing
History of rock climbing
Rankings of most career IFSC gold medals

References

External links 

Living people
2001 births
Female climbers
Italian rock climbers
Sportspeople from Rome
Sport climbers at the 2018 Summer Youth Olympics
Sport climbers at the 2020 Summer Olympics
Olympic sport climbers of Italy
21st-century Italian women
IFSC Climbing World Championships medalists
IFSC Climbing World Cup overall medalists